The 2009–10 Rugby-Bundesliga was the 39th edition of this competition and the 90th edition of the German rugby union championship. Ten teams played a home-and-away season with a finals round between the top four teams at the end. The bottom two teams are relegated. The season started on 29 August 2009 and finished with the championship final on 29 May 2010, interrupted by a winter break from early December to late March.

The competition's defending champion was SC 1880 Frankfurt, who won it in the previous two seasons. In the 2010 final, SC 1880 lost to Heidelberger RK, the previous seasons runners-up, which won its first championship since 1986 and its seventh overall. The final was drawn 22-all after regular time and was decided in extra time, where HRK scored 17 unanswered points to be crowned German champions of the men, already having won the 2010 women's final earlier that year. The 2010 final was contested by the two teams expected to do so at the start of the season, SC 1880 and HRK being the only two teams in Germany considered professional. The final was considered to have been of high niveau, with long-term German Bundestrainer Peter Ianusevici declaring it the best German championship final he had ever watched.

Below the Rugby-Bundesliga sat the 2nd Rugby-Bundesliga, which is divided into two divisions with ten teams each. With the RC Luxembourg, a team from Luxembourg, a non-German side competed in the league in 2009-10. The inclusion of this side in the 2009 promotion round to the 2nd Bundesliga had caused some debate in regard to its legality, as the club had not qualified to do so through the German league system and was not a member of any of the German regional rugby federations. However, RC Luxembourg's application was declared valid in regard to the German Rugby Federation's rules and regulations and the team finished second in the promotion round, earning a place in the 2nd Bundesliga for 2009-10.

Overview
The 2009-10 modus was somewhat different from the previous season. The competition had been expanded from nine to ten teams. It marks the first time since introduction of the single-division Bundesliga in 2001, that ten teams competed in the league. This change of modus was decided upon on 19 July 2008 at the annual general meeting of the German rugby association, the DRV. It was decided to expand the league to ten teams for 2009-10. It was also then decided to introduce an extended play-off format. All up, the number of season games in the Rugby-Bundesliga increases to 94 from 76.

Like in 2008-09, the top four teams qualified for the finals. The two semi-finals winners then contested the championship final.

At the bottom end of the table, nominally the last two teams were relegated while the 2nd Rugby-Bundesliga champions are promoted, however, this was subject to the 2nd Bundesliga champions accepting promotion, which was not the case.

The defending champion in 2009-10 was SC 1880 Frankfurt, who beat Heidelberger RK in the 2008-09 final while the ASV Köln Rugby and DSV 78 Hannover were newly promoted to the league, having replaced the DRC Hannover. Suffering from a string of injuries, especially to its forward line, and heavy defeats during the season, ASV Köln Rugby made the decision in mid-April 2010, to withdraw from the Rugby-Bundesliga and not to play its five remaining matches. Köln thereby was automatically relegated from the league.

In the 2nd Bundesliga, the winners of the two divisions were nominally promoted to the Bundesliga, unless they were reserve teams, in which case the right for promotion would have gone to the next-best non-reserve team. The bottom two teams in the 2nd Bundesliga faced the prospect of relegation to the Rugby-Regionalliga. In the South/West Division, the Karlsruher SV Rugby withdrew in March 2010, its record being expulsed.

As a sign of the gap between the Bundesliga and the 2nd Bundesliga, TSV Victoria Linden, who only won the 2009-10 North/East division in the last round of the championship, declined promotion, citing the additional cost of travelling and the limited player pool as their reason. The South/West champion, Stuttgarter RC, has also indicated that it would not take up promotion because of the loss of eight first-team players at the end of the season, leaving the Bundesliga with only eight clubs for the next season. It also meant, for the first time ever, that no club from Hanover would compete at the top level of German rugby.

DSV 78 protested the decision to reduce the league to eight teams again and thereby relegating the club. For the 2nd Bundesliga, this also meant, only one team each would be promoted to the two regional divisions, in the North/East, this was SC Siemensstadt, the club being directly promoted, while, in the South/West, TV Pforzheim won the promotion tournament of the five southern Regionalliga champions in Nuremberg on 12 June 2010.

Bundesliga table

 Relegated: ASV Köln Rugby
 Promoted: None 
 ASV Köln Rugby withdrew in April 2010, its record being expulsed.

Bundesliga results

 ASV Köln Rugby played 13 of its 18 scheduled matches before withdrawing, results were later expulsed from the record.

Key

Player statistics

Try scorers
The leading try scores in the Rugby-Bundesliga 2009–10 season were (10 tries or more):

Point scorers
The leading point scores in the Rugby-Bundesliga 2009–10 season were (100 points or more):

Per club
The top try and point scorers per club were:

Semi-finals and final

Semi-finals

Final

2nd Bundesliga tables

South/West

 Promoted to Bundesliga: None
 Relegated from Bundesliga: ASV Köln Rugby
 Relegated from 2nd Bundesliga: Karlsruher SV Rugby, RC Mainz
 Promoted to 2nd Bundesliga: TV Pforzheim
 Karlsruher SV Rugby withdrew in March 2010, its record being expulsed.

North/East

 Promoted to Bundesliga: None
 Relegated from Bundesliga: None
 Relegated from 2nd Bundesliga: FT Adler Kiel Rugby
 Promoted to 2nd Bundesliga: SC Siemensstadt

2nd Bundesliga final

References

External links
 rugbyweb.de - Rugby-Bundesliga table & results 
 Rugby-Journal - Bundesliga table & results 
 Totalrugby.de - Bundesliga table & results 

2009-10
2009–10 in German rugby union
Germany
2009 in Luxembourgian sport
2010 in Luxembourgian sport